The Popular Party of Reforms is a political party in Iran. 

It is led by the cleric Mohammad Zare Foumani, who was fired by Mehdi Karroubi from his presidential campaign in 2009 and did not support Iranian Green Movement.

The party issued a statement in 2013 and supported candidacy of Akbar Hashemi Rafsanjani for president.

References

External links 
 Official website of Mazandaran branch

Reformist political groups in Iran
Political parties established in 2012
2012 establishments in Iran
Electoral lists for Iranian legislative election, 2012